Timothy Mark Alexander (born 29 March 1973) in Chertsey, Surrey, England, is an English retired professional footballer who played as a central defender for Wimbledon and Barnet in the Football League.

References

1973 births
Living people
Sportspeople from Chertsey
English footballers
Association football defenders
Barnet F.C. players
Wimbledon F.C. players
Ebbsfleet United F.C. players
Welling United F.C. players
Dagenham & Redbridge F.C. players
Woking F.C. players
Bromley F.C. players
Walton & Hersham F.C. players
The New Saints F.C. players
Rhyl F.C. players
English Football League players
National League (English football) players
Footballers from Surrey